Reginald Richardson (born 1 March 1990) is a Vincentian professional footballer who plays for Vincentian club Pastures and the Saint Vincent and the Grenadines national team.

References

External links

 

1990 births
Living people
Saint Vincent and the Grenadines footballers
Saint Vincent and the Grenadines international footballers
Saint Vincent and the Grenadines under-20 international footballers
Saint Vincent and the Grenadines youth international footballers
Pastures F.C. players
Oulun Palloseura players
Parham F.C. players
Ykkönen players
Kakkonen players
Antigua and Barbuda Premier Division players
Expatriate footballers in Finland
Saint Vincent and the Grenadines expatriate footballers
Association football central defenders
Saint Vincent and the Grenadines expatriate sportspeople in Finland
Saint Vincent and the Grenadines expatriate sportspeople in Antigua and Barbuda
Expatriate footballers in Antigua and Barbuda
People from Saint Patrick Parish, Saint Vincent and the Grenadines